Amathusia masina, the rusty palmking, is a butterfly found in the  Indomalayan realm It belongs to the Satyrinae, a subfamily of the brush-footed butterflies.

Description

Described as a new species of Amathusia characterised by the oval depression of the scent organ on the upper hindwing having an oval hair tuft near the base of space 7 and a hair pencil. The ground colour is rich reddish brown and there are basal white stripes

Subspecies
 A. m. masina Borneo
 A. m. malaya   Corbet & Pendlebury, 1936  Peninsular Malaya, Sumatra
 A. m. chtonia   Fruhstorfer   Bangka Island

References

masina